Felton may refer to:

Places
in Australia
Felton, Queensland

in Canada
Felton, Ontario
Felton River, in Estrie, Quebec

in Cuba
Felton, Mayarí

in the United Kingdom
Felton, Herefordshire
Felton, Northumberland
Felton, Somerset
Felton, a former name of the parish of Whitchurch, Somerset

in the United States
Felton, California
Felton, Delaware
Felton, Minnesota
Felton, Pennsylvania
Felton Township, Minnesota

Other uses
Felton (given name)
Felton (surname)

See also
 Feltham
 Felten (disambiguation)
 Fulton (disambiguation)